This is a list of the guest cast of characters in the 2009–2010 Filipino primetime religious television series May Bukas Pa produced by Dreamscape Entertainment and originally aired on ABS-CBN from February 2, 2009 to February 5, 2010.

List of guest cast

2009

Chapters 1–28 (Episodes 1–160)

Chapters 28–29 (Episodes 161–195)

Chapters 29–34 (Episodes 196–237)

2010

Chapter 34 (Episodes 238–240)

Chapters 34–37 (Episodes 241–257)

Chapter 38 (Episodes 258–263)

References

Lists of actors by drama television series
Lists of guest appearances in television